The Women's 800m Freestyle event at the 10th FINA World Aquatics Championships swam on 25–26 July 2003 in Barcelona, Spain. Preliminary heats swam during the morning session on July 25, with the top-8 finishers advancing to swim the race again in the Final during the evening session on July 26.

Prior to the event, the World (WR) and Championship (CR) records were:
WR: 8:16.22 swum by Janet Evans (USA) on August 20, 1989 in Tokyo, Japan
CR: 8:24.05 swum by Janet Evans (USA) on January 12, 1991 in Perth, Australia

Results

Final

Preliminaries

References

Swimming at the 2003 World Aquatics Championships
2003 in women's swimming